Maslama ibn Abd al-Malik (in Greek sources , Masalmas;  – 24 December 738) was an Umayyad prince and one of the most prominent Arab generals of the early decades of the 8th century, leading several campaigns against the Byzantine Empire and the Khazar Khaganate. He achieved great fame especially for leading the second and last Arab siege of the Byzantine capital Constantinople.

He launched his military career leading the annual summer raids against the Byzantines in Anatolia. By 709, he was governor over Qinnasrin (northern Syria), the Jazira (Upper Mesopotamia), Armenia, and Adharbayjan, giving him control over the Caliphate's northern frontier. From this position, he launched the first Arab expeditions against the Khazars across the Caucasus. Maslama's brother, Caliph Sulayman, appointed him to lead the campaign to capture Constantinople in 715, but it ended in disaster for the Arabs and he was ordered to withdraw by Sulayman's successor, Umar II, in 718.

After his brother Yazid II came to power, Maslama was sent to suppress the revolt of Yazid ibn al-Muhallab in Iraq. Although successful, Maslama was recalled in 721, due to the Caliph's concerns over Maslama's growing power as governor of Iraq. Maslama was excluded from the line of succession because his mother was a slave concubine, but he secured the accession of his other brother, Hisham. Under Hisham, Maslama resumed the campaigns against the Byzantines and the Khazars, with mixed results. In 732, he was replaced by his cousin, the future caliph Marwan II.

Maslama was granted extensive estates by his brothers, investing considerable sums to reclaim and develop agricultural lands in Balis, where he resided, the Balikh valley, and the marshlands of southern Iraq. The estates were inherited by his descendants, but were mostly confiscated by the Abbasid dynasty after they toppled the Umayyads in 750. Nonetheless, out of respect for Maslama's battlefield reputation, his descendants were largely spared from the Abbasids' wide-scale persecutions of the Umayyad family.

Family background 
Maslama was a son of the Umayyad caliph Abd al-Malik ibn Marwan and half-brother of the caliphs al-Walid I, Sulayman, Yazid II and Hisham. Maslama himself was excluded from the line of succession as his mother was a slave concubine. Around 691, Abd al-Malik arranged Maslama's marriage to al-Rabab, the daughter of the Qaysi tribal chief Zufar ibn al-Harith al-Kilabi, as part of the settlement to end Zufar's revolt against the Umayyads.

Early military career 
Maslama is first mentioned as leading, along with his nephew al-Abbas ibn al-Walid, the annual summer campaign (pl. ) against the Byzantine Empire in 705. His first major expedition was the 707–708 campaign against the Byzantine city of Tyana in southeastern Asia Minor, which was launched in retaliation for the defeat and death of the distinguished general Maimun the Mardaite the year before. The siege lasted through winter and the Arab army faced great hardship, but after the Arabs defeated a Byzantine relief force in spring 708, the city surrendered. A few months later, in the summer, Maslama led another expedition into Asia Minor and defeated a Byzantine army near Amorium, while in 709 he raided into the region of Isauria.

In the same year, Maslama was appointed military governor of the Jazira, Armenia and Adharbayjan, succeeding his uncle Muhammad ibn Marwan. This he added to the post of governor of Jund Qinnasrin in northern Syria, which he already held during his father's reign. His governorship of Qinnasrin was not as well-documented by early Arabic chroniclers as his other posts. Together, command of these provinces effectively gave him complete control of the Caliphate's entire northwestern border. From this position he launched several campaigns against the Byzantines, devastating Galatia and sacking Amaseia in 712, and taking Melitene in 714. He was also the first to establish the Caliphate's presence north of the Caucasus, leading to the commencement of direct conflict with the Khazars (the Second Arab–Khazar War). In 710, he had marched his army up to Bab al-Abwab ('Gate of Gates', the Arabic name of Derbent), which he took and destroyed during a second expedition in 714.

The early Muslim sources generally credit Maslama with leading the Hajj pilgrimage to Mecca in 713, though his cousin Abd al-Aziz ibn al-Walid is also cited as the leader that year.

Siege of Constantinople 

From 715 Maslama was the leading general in the plans of his brother, Caliph Sulayman, to conquer the Byzantine capital, Constantinople, as Sulayman himself was too ill to lead the campaign in person. Maslama led a huge army, which sources report to have numbered 120,000 men and 1,800 ships. In late 715, the Arab vanguard crossed the Taurus Mountains into Byzantine territory, Maslama following in spring 716 with the main army and the fleet. The Arabs' plans were aided by the recurrence of civil strife, which had plagued the Byzantines since 695; Emperor Anastasius II was overthrown by Theodosius III in 715, who was in turn opposed by the strategos of the Anatolic Theme, Leo the Isaurian. Maslama hoped to use the divisions among the Byzantines for his own benefit and initiated contacts with Leo, but the latter used the negotiations to outwit the Arab general and occupied for himself the strategic city of Amorium, which Maslama had intended to use as his winter base. As a result, Maslama marched further west, to the coastlands of the Thracesian Theme. There he spent the winter, while Leo marched against Theodosius in Constantinople, which he entered in March 717.

In early summer 717, Maslama with his army crossed from Asia into Europe over the Dardanelles, and proceeded to besiege Constantinople from land and sea. His navy, however, was soon neutralized by the use of Greek fire, and as his army was unable to overcome the city's land defences, the siege continued into the winter, which was especially severe that year, with snow covering the ground for three months. Maslama had brought along many supplies, but they either soon ran out or were lost—Arab accounts make much of Leo tricking the Arab general yet again during negotiations into handing over or destroying a significant part of his hoarded supplies—and the army began to suffer from hunger and disease. In spring, reinforcements arrived in the form of two large fleets from Egypt and Ifriqiya, but a large part of their crews, who were mostly conscripted Christians, went over to the Byzantines, and Leo's navy managed to destroy or capture the Arab fleets. The Byzantines also defeated an Arab army marching to aid the besiegers through Asia Minor, while Maslama's men had to contend with attacks by the Bulgars as well, which cost them many men. The siege had clearly failed, and the new Caliph, Umar II, ordered Maslama to retreat. On 15 August 718, after thirteen months of siege, the Arabs departed.

Governorship in Iraq 
After his failure at Constantinople, Maslama was dispatched to Iraq to quell the Kharijites, an Islamic sect opposed to the Umayyads. Following Umar's death and the accession of his brother Yazid II in 720, he was tasked with suppressing the mass Iraqi revolt led by Yazid ibn al-Muhallab, whom he defeated and killed in August 720. As governor of Iraq, a major provincial office whose authority extended over the eastern half of the Caliphate, Maslama championed the Qays in their factional conflict with the Yaman, whose interests Ibn al-Muhallab had represented. Maslama dismissed all the Yamani sub-governors of Iraq and the eastern provinces and voided all the orders Ibn al-Muhallab had issued while in office. Maslama soon fell out of favour with the Caliph, who resented and feared his power as governor of Iraq, as well as his interference in the caliphal succession: Maslama favoured his brother Hisham over Yazid's son al-Walid. Yazid recalled Maslama from his post, ostensibly because he had failed to deliver his provinces' tax haul to the caliphal capital, Damascus, and replaced him with Maslama's Qaysi protege, Umar ibn Hubayra al-Fazari.

Command of the Caucasus frontier

Maslama then disappears from the sources and re-emerges in 725, shortly after Yazid's death and the accession of Hisham, who sent Maslama to replace the veteran general al-Jarrah ibn Abdallah al-Hakami in the Caucasus front against the Khazars. Initially, however, Maslama was mostly active in the Byzantine front, and the war against the Khazars was delegated to al-Harith ibn Amr al-Ta'i. In winter 725, Maslama led an expedition against Asia Minor from Melitene, which culminated in the sack of Caesarea on 13 January 726. Along with the capture of Gangra by Abdallah al-Battal in 727, this was one of the major successes of Arab arms against the Byzantines in the 720s. A few months later, he also led the otherwise unremarkable northern  into Byzantine territory. In 727–728, his attention was diverted by Khazar attacks which reached deep into Adharbayjan. Although Maslama was able to drive them back and recover control of the Darial Pass, his 728 campaign across the Caucasus was difficult, bloody and indecisive. Maslama's troops were reportedly engaged in up to thirty or forty days of constant fighting in miserable weather, and although he claimed victory in a battle over the Khazar khagan himself, the expedition did not achieve any results, and came close to being defeated. Certainly it did little to stop Khazar attacks south of the Caucasus, which resumed in 729. Maslama was removed from office in the same year, and replaced by al-Jarrah. He is then recorded by the Byzantine chronicler Theophanes the Confessor as having been responsible for the sack of the fortress of Charsianon in late 730, but Arab sources credit Mu'awiya ibn Hisham for this act.

In the Caucasus, the situation quickly deteriorated after Maslama's departure. While al-Jarrah campaigned north of the Caucasus, the Khazars swung behind him and attacked his main base, Ardabil. Hastening to relieve the city, al-Jarrah was defeated and killed, and his army practically annihilated in a battle outside the city on 9 December 730. Faced with this crisis, the Caliph appointed Maslama as the new governor of Armenia and Adharbayjan but, in the meantime, the veteran general Sa'id ibn Amr al-Harashi managed to recover the situation and defeat the Khazar army. Maslama, allegedly out of jealousy for Sa'id's successes, had Sa'id imprisoned until Hisham ordered his release. Throughout 730 and 731 Maslama, with a large army at his disposal, cleared the provinces south of the Caucasus of the Khazars, and then advanced beyond the mountains, sacking a couple of settlements and defeating the khagan in pitched battle. He also recovered the strategic fortress of Bab al-Abwab from the Khazars who had occupied it by poisoning its water supply. He reorganized it as a military colony, resettling it with 24,000 soldiers. His tenure however was evidently judged as not successful enough, and he was replaced on 3 March 732 by his cousin and protege Marwan ibn Muhammad.

Retirement
Maslama thereafter retired from public life, possibly to his extensive estates in northern Syria. He backed Hisham's attempts to install his son, Abu Shakir Maslama, as his successor, in place of the heir apparent, Yazid II's son al-Walid. Maslama died on 24 December 738. With his death, Hisham lost a major supporter for his succession plans in the Umayyad family. Al-Walid acceded after Hisham's death in 743.

Legacy 
Maslama was among "the most celebrated generals of the Umayyad house", in the words of the historian Patricia Crone. As the commander of the great assault on Constantinople and the "founder of Islamic Derbent", for over twenty years in the early 9th century, Maslama was "one of the principal props of Umayyad power and a foremost actor on the stage of the East", according to the historian Douglas M. Dunlop. His fame spread far and wide in the Muslim world, and his exploits and chivalry passed into legend.

Maslama's attempt to capture Constantinople in particular became celebrated in later Muslim literature, with several surviving accounts, mostly semi-fictional, in which the historical defeat was transformed into a sort of victory: Maslama was said to have departed only after symbolically entering the Byzantine capital on his horse accompanied by thirty riders; Leo received him with honour and led him to the Hagia Sophia, where the emperor paid homage to the Arab general. The tales of the siege influenced similar episodes in Arabic epic literature, where Maslama appears associated with Abdallah al-Battal, another legendary Arab hero of the wars against Byzantium.

Furthermore, Byzantine tradition, as recorded in the 10th-century De Administrando Imperio, held that during the siege Maslama convinced the Byzantines to build Constantinople's first mosque, near the city's praetorium. In reality, the mosque near the praetorium was most likely erected in about 860, as a result of an Arab embassy in that year. It survived down to the sack of the city by the Fourth Crusade. Later Ottoman tradition also ascribed the building of the Arap Mosque (located outside Constantinople proper in Galata) to Maslama, although it erroneously dated this to around 686, probably confusing Maslama's attack with the first Arab siege in the 670s.

Land development and reclamation projects 
Several Umayyad princes were granted estates by the caliphs, usually land of little value, which the princes developed for profit. Abd al-Malik or al-Walid I granted Maslama an estate at Balis and its environs, where agriculture was rain-dependent. The previous inhabitants of Balis had fled the town during the early 7th-century Muslim conquest and it was re-settled by Syrian Arab tribal warriors who converted to Islam. Upon his own initiative or per the inhabitants' request, Maslama revitalized the lands by digging a canal there, called Nahr Maslama after him, to irrigate its fields, and built a wall around Balis. The estate was not subject to the land tax paid by non-Muslims; it paid the minimal tithe to the state. Maslama collected one third of the remaining yield, the rest going to the inhabitants, who were effectively sharecroppers. 

An extensive former canal that was excavated near the site of Dibsi Faraj (medieval Qasirin), in the 1970s, has been identified with Nahr Maslama. The canal ran parallel to the Euphrates river, corresponding with medieval accounts tracing Nahr Maslama's route from Balis through Qasirin to the site of Siffin (Tell Abu Hureyra). The 8th-century Syriac Chronicle of Zuqnin mentions that Maslama built several villages and forts along the canal. The early Muslim sources mention one fortified village he founded, Na'ura (Waterwheel), between Balis and Aleppo, which has not been identified. It remained inhabited at least until the 10th century. Between his frequent military campaigns and his other estates in Syria and the Jazira, it is unlikely Maslama spent significant time in Balis before his retirement. In his absence, the Umayyads at Balis were led by his brother Sa'id al-Khayr.

Maslama founded the dual site of Hisn Maslama and Bajadda on both sides of the Balikh River valley. There, he built a fortified compound and dug a canal, also known as Nahr Maslama, to transport water from the Balikh to a large cistern which supplied the new town, whose inhabitants were Muslim landed settlers. He granted Bajadda to one of his Qaysi lieutenants, Asid ibn Zafir al-Sulami, who further developed it. Hisn Maslama, which Maslama probably used as one of his residences, was probably abandoned after the mid-9th century. 

Another of Maslama's major land reclamation projects was in the marshes of southern Iraq. There, frequent breaches of embankments caused mass flooding, which ruined the farmlands of the region. Al-Walid I would not fund the restoration of the farms due to the high cost, estimated to be 3,000,000 dirhams. Instead, Maslama volunteered to pay the sum in exchange for the Caliph granting him the land. Maslama drained the marshes by digging a canal and brought farmers to cultivate the reclaimed lands, enabling his estates to prosper. According to the historian Hugh N. Kennedy, Maslama "clearly recouped his investment, presumably from a share of the crops".

Building works 
The historian Jere L. Bacharach speculates that Maslama was the most likely founder of the Umayyad Mosque of Aleppo, whose original construction is otherwise attributed to al-Walid I or Sulayman. Most of the present structure dates to the 12th–13th centuries. The Umayyad-era  (castle) in Balis, a fortified residence with a canal and a wool production center, was possibly a construction by Maslama or Sa'id al-Khayr. Maslama may have been responsible for some construction works in the town of Qinnasrin. In Damascus, he had an iwan (enclosed hall) called after him alongside the residences of other Umayyad dynasts, including the caliphal Khadra Palace, situated behind the Umayyad Mosque.

Descendants 
Maslama's descendants inherited his estates and continued living in northern Syria after his death. In the aftermath of the Abbasid Revolution, which toppled the Umayyads in 750, an Abbasid officer harassed Maslama's family and seized his fortified residence at Na'ura. The incident provoked the Qaysi allies of Maslama's family, led by Zufar ibn al-Harith's grandson Abu al-Ward, to revolt against the Abbasids. The revolt was soon after quashed and Maslama's estates were confiscated and transferred to the Abbasids. Around the same time, a son of Maslama, Muhammad, raised a revolt in Harran, but it was also suppressed.

The Abbasid caliphs were nonetheless sympathetic toward the memory of Maslama and toward his family. His descendants remained in northern Syria, where several were still recorded in the sources around a century later. His grandson, Muhammad ibn Yazid al-Hisni, a poet, was spared by Caliph al-Mahdi when the latter visited Hisn Maslama in 780, despite making a slight toward the Abbasids in verse. He was ousted shortly after and died in hiding.

Notes

References

Sources

Further reading

738 deaths
8th-century Arabs
Arab generals
Generals of the Umayyad Caliphate
Sons of Umayyad caliphs
Umayyad governors of Arminiya
Umayyad governors of Iraq
Umayyad governors of Qinnasrin
Umayyad people of the Arab–Byzantine wars
Umayyad people of the Arab–Khazar wars
Year of birth unknown